Pushing Daisies is an American comedy-drama television series created by Bryan Fuller that aired on ABC. It premiered in the United States on ABC on October 3, 2007; in Canada on October 2, 2007 on CTV; and aired in the UK on ITV.

Series overview

Episodes

Season 1 (2007) 
Due to the 2007–08 Writers Guild of America strike, this season consisted of only nine episodes. The episodes aired a day earlier in Canada on CTV before their air dates in the United States.

Season 2 (2008–09)
Pushing Daisies was renewed for a second season in February 2008 by ABC for the 2008–09 television season. On November 20, 2008, after six episodes were broadcast, ABC canceled the show.  A total of thirteen episodes were produced for the season, with four of them broadcast in November and December. The final three episodes premiered world wide on German free-to-air television network ProSieben and were later broadcast in the U.S. on Saturdays starting May 30 and ending on June 13, 2009, to promote the release of the Season 2 DVD. Several of the first 10 episodes aired a day earlier in Canada on A before their air dates in the United States. The final three episodes were first broadcast in the UK in April 2009 prior to airing in the U.S.

References

External links
 

Episodes
Lists of American comedy-drama television series episodes
Pushing Daisies